Kjeld Erik Brødsgaard is Professor of China Studies at the Department of International Economics and Management and Director of the China Policy Program at Copenhagen Business School. He is an internationally recognized authority on China's political economy, including state-Party-business relations and the role of the Communist Party of China in the current modernization process.

Education
Kjeld Erik Brødsgaard obtained MA degree in History in 1978 from Aarhus University and the University of Copenhagen. He studied in Peking University (1978-1979), Nanjing University (1982-1983) and Stanford University (1980-1981). In 1990 Kjeld Erik Brødsgaard obtained his Ph.D. in Modern Chinese Studies from the University of Copenhagen after successfully defending of a thesis titled "Readjustment and Reform in the Chinese Economy, 1953-86"

Career

Academic career
From 1984 to 1986 Kjeld Erik Brødsgaard was a Carlsberg Foundation Research Fellow. In 1986 he was appointed Assistant Professor in Third World Studies at the East Asian Institute of the University of Copenhagen, while also serving as director of the university's Centre for East and Southeast Asian Studies. From 1990-2003 he was Associate Professor of Modern East Asian History at Copenhagen University. In 2003 he moved to Copenhagen Business School (CBS) to become Professor of International Business in Asia/China and to head the Asia Research Centre. He has held visiting professorships at, among others, Peking University, National University of Singapore and Academia Sinica.

He is Honorary Professor at South China University of Technology and an Honorary Research Fellow at Peking University

Editorial work
Kjeld Erik Brødsgaard serves on many editorial boards, including China: An International Journal; Journal of Current Chinese Affairs; Governance and Public Policy in China; and China Report.

He is the founder and chief editor of the Copenhagen Journal of Asian Studies

Publications
Kina i Moderne Tid - Samfund, Økonomi og Politik (2019)
From Accelerated Accumulation to Socialist Market Economy in China (2017)
Critical Readings on the Chinese Communist Party, 4. vols (2017)
Chinese Politics as Fragmented Authoritarianism (2017)
Globalization and Public Sector Reform in China (2014)
Hainan - State, Society and Business in a Chinese Province (2009 and 2012)
The Chinese Communist Party in Reform (with Zheng Yongnian) (2006 and 2009)
Bring the Party Back in: How China is Governed (with Zheng Yongnian) (2004)
State Capacity in East Asia (with Suan Yong) (2000 and 2003)
Reconstructing Twentieth Century China (with David Strand) (1998)
Kina efter Deng (1998)

References

20th-century births
Living people
Danish computer scientists
Aarhus University alumni
University of Copenhagen alumni
Peking University alumni
Nanjing University alumni
Stanford University alumni
Academic staff of Peking University
Academic staff of the National University of Singapore
Academic staff of the University of Copenhagen
Academic staff of Copenhagen Business School
Year of birth missing (living people)
Place of birth missing (living people)